Metropolitan Vladimir may refer to:
Volodymyr Sabodan (1935–2014), head of the Ukrainian Orthodox Church (Moscow Patriarchate)
Vladimir Bogoyavlensky (1848–1918), Metropolitan of Moscow